COVID-19 infection in pregnancy is associated with several pregnancy complications. However, pregnancy does not appear to increase the susceptibility of becoming infected by COVID-19. Recommendations for the prevention of COVID-19 include the same measures as non-pregnant people.

Effect of COVID-19 in pregnancy

According to a systematic review and meta-analysis in 2021, COVID-19 is associated with stillbirth, pre-eclampsia and preterm birth. According to the same review, compared with mild COVID-19, severe COVID-19 is strongly associated with preeclampsia, preterm birth, gestational diabetes and low birth weight. A review in 2022 suggests that pregnant women are at increased risk of severe COVID-19 disease, with an increased rate of being hospitalized to the intensive care unit and requiring ventilation death, but was not associated with a statistically significant increase in mortality. However vaccination against COVID-19 was not associated with an increase in miscarriage or reduction in live birth.

Recommendations
The World Health Organization and Centers for Disease Control and Prevention of the United States advises pregnant women to do the same things as the general public to avoid infection, such as covering cough, avoid interacting with sick people, cleaning hands with soap and water or sanitizer.

The CDC encourages pregnant women to get COVID-19 vaccines.

See also 
 Vertically transmitted infection
 Gendered impact of the COVID-19 pandemic
 Impact of the COVID-19 pandemic on abortion in the United States

References 

pregnancy
Health issues in pregnancy